The following is a timeline of the history of the city of Benguela, Angola.

Prior to 20th century

 1617 -  founded in Portuguese Angola, under colonial governor .
 1641 - Benguela taken by Dutch.
 1648 - Dutch ousted; Portuguese in power again.
 1779 - Antonio Jose Pimental de Castro e Mesquita appointed colonial governor of Benguela.
 1784 - Pedro Jose Correia de Quevedo Homem e Magalhaes becomes governor.
 1792 - Francisco Paim da Camara Ornellas becomes governor (approximate date).
 1795 -  appointed governor.
 1803 - Francisco Infante de Sequeira Correa da Silva becomes governor (approximate date).
 1810 - Jose Maria Doutel d'Almeida becomes governor (approximate date).
 1814 - Joao de Alvellos Leiria becomes governor (approximate date).
 1816 - Joze Joaquim Marques de Graca becomes governor (approximate date).
 1817 - Manoel d'Abreu de Mello e Alvim becomes governor (approximate date).
 1828 - Joaquim Aurelio de Oliveira becomes governor (approximate date).
 1836 - Slave trade officially abolished.
 1900 - Benguella province active.

20th century
 1912
 Caminho de Ferro de Benguela (railway) to Huambo begins operating (approximate date).
 Jornal de Benguela newspaper begins publication.
 1915 - Sporting Clube de Benguela formed.
 1920 - Clube Nacional de Benguela (football club) formed.
 1921 - Império Sport Clube formed
 1940 - Population: 14,243.
 1960 - Population: 23,256.
 1963 - Sé Catedral de Nossa Senhora de Fátima (church) built.
 1965 - Lomaum Dam built on the Catumbela River in vicinity of Benguela.
 1970
 Population: 40,996 (including 10,175 whites).
 Roman Catholic Diocese of Benguela established.
 1972 - Autódromo de Benguela opens.
 1975 - Benguela becomes part of newly independent Republic of Angola.
 1981 - Estrela Clube Primeiro de Maio (football club) formed.
 1983 - Population: 155,000 (estimate).

21st century
 2005 - Population: 151,235 (estimate).
 2007
 Pavilhão Acácias Rubras (arena) opens.
 August: Part of AfroBasket 2007 played in Benguela.
 2009
 Estádio Nacional de Ombaka (stadium) and 4 de Abril Bridge (to Lobito) open.
  founded.
 2010 - January: Part of 2010 Africa Cup of Nations football contest played in Benguela.
 2012 - Catumbela Airport opens in vicinity of Benguela.
 2018 - Population: 623,777 (estimate, urban agglomeration).

See also
 Benguela history
  (1617-1869)
 Timeline of Luanda

References

This article incorporates information from the Portuguese Wikipedia and German Wikipedia.

Bibliography

External links

  (Bibliography)
  (Bibliography)
  (Images, etc.)
  (Images, etc.)

Benguela
Benguela
Years in Angola
Benguela